The Colebatch Ministry was the 14th Ministry of the Government of Western Australia and was led by Nationalist Premier Hal Colebatch. It succeeded the Lefroy Ministry on 17 April 1919 after Sir Henry Lefroy's resignation as premier. Colebatch, a member of the Legislative Council and the first (and so far only) from that chamber to ever be asked to form a ministry, had the problem of finding a conveniently-located country seat which was not held by the Country Party. Before he could consolidate his leadership, his handling of the "Battle of the Barricades" on the waterfront severely damaged his standing and he stood aside. On 17 May 1919, the First Mitchell Ministry was formed by the Minister for Lands, James Mitchell.

The following ministers served for the duration of the Ministry:

References

  (no ISBN)

Western Australian ministries
Ministries of George V